Tephritis multiguttata is a species of tephritid or fruit flies in the genus Tephritis of the family Tephritidae.

Distribution
Iran.

References

Tephritinae
Insects described in 1913
Taxa named by Theodor Becker
Diptera of Asia